Cryptospira is a genus of sea snails, marine gastropod mollusks in the subfamily Pruninae of the family Marginellidae, the margin snails.

Species
According to the World Register of Marine Species (WoRMS), the following species with valid names are included within the genus Cryptospira :
 Cryptospira bridgettae Wakefield, 2010
 Cryptospira cloveriana Wakefield, 2010
 Cryptospira dactylus (Lamarck, 1822)
 Cryptospira elegans (Gmelin, 1791)
 Cryptospira fischeri (Bavay, 1903)
 Cryptospira glauca Jousseaume, 1875
 Cryptospira grisea (Jousseaume, 1917)
 † Cryptospira hordeastra Darragh, 2017 
 Cryptospira immersa (Reeve, 1865)
 Cryptospira marchii Jousseaume, 1875
 Cryptospira mccleeryi Wakefield, 2010
 Cryptospira merguiensis Bozzetti, 2015
 Cryptospira onychina (A. Adams & Reeve, 1850)
 Cryptospira praecallosa (Higgins, 1876)
 Cryptospira quadrilineata (Gaskoin, 1849)
 Cryptospira sabellii Cossignani, 2006
 Cryptospira scripta (Hinds, 1844)
 Cryptospira strigata (Dillwyn, 1817)
 Cryptospira trailli (Reeve, 1865)
 Cryptospira tricincta (Hinds, 1844)
 Cryptospira ventricosa (G. Fischer, 1807)
 Cryptospira wallacei Wakefield, 2010

Synonyms:
 Cryptospira angustata (G.B. Sowerby, 1846) is a synonym of Volvarina angustata (G.B. Sowerby, 1846)
 Cryptospira caducocincta (May, 1916) is a synonym of Mesoginella caducocincta (May, 1916)
 Cryptospira loebbeckeana (Weinkauff, 1878) is a synonym of Cryptospira praecallosa (Higgins, 1876)
 Cryptospira mabellae (Melvill & Standen, 1901) is a synonym of Prunum mabellae (Melvill & Standen, 1901)
 Cryptospira martini Petit, 1853 is a synonym of Prunum martini (Petit, 1853)
 Cryptospira olivella (Reeve, 1865) is a synonym of Mesoginella olivella (Reeve, 1865)
 Cryptospira quiquandoni Cossignani, 2006 is a synonym of Cryptospira immersa (Reeve, 1865)
 Cryptospira rubens (Martens, 1881) is a synonym of Prunum rubens (Martens, 1881)
 Cryptospira verreauxi Jousseaume, 1875 is a synonym of Volvarina verreauxi (Jousseaume, 1875)

References

Further reading 
 Bavay, A., 1903. Description d'une espèce nouvelle du genre Marginella. Journal de Conchyliologie 50("1902"): 407-408
 Coovert G. A. & Coovert H. K. (1995). "Revision of the supraspecific classification of marginelliform gastropods". The Nautilus 109(2-3): 43-110
 Wakefield A. (2010). :A revision of the genus Cryptospira Hinds, 1844 (Caenogastropoda: Marginellidae)". Novapex Hors-série 7: 1-55.

External links
 Hinds R. B. (1844). Descriptions of Marginellae collected during the voyage of H. M. S. Sulphur, and from the collection of H. Cuming Esq. Proceedings of the Zoological Society of London. 12: 72-77

Marginellidae